At the 1924 Winter Olympics in Chamonix, five speed skating events were contested, all for men. The competitions were held on Saturday, January 26, 1924 and on Sunday, January 27, 1924. Charles Jewtraw won the first gold medal of the 1924 Winter Games, and Clas Thunberg and Roald Larsen each won medals in all five events, with Thunberg winning 3 gold.

Medal summary

Participating nations
Eleven speed skaters competed in all four individual events.

A total of 31 speed skaters from ten nations competed at the Chamonix Games:

Medal table

References

External links
International Olympic Committee results database
Official Report (digitized copy online)
 

 
1924 Winter Olympics events
1924
Olympics, 1924